Bago Sarr Hnint Thu Ei Virus Myarr is a 2016 Burmese comedy film, directed by Kyaw Zaw Lin starring Pyay Ti Oo, Kyaw Ye Aung, Yan Aung, Yaza Ne Win, Soe Myat Thuzar and Patricia. The film, produced by Aung Thiri Film Production premiered Myanmar on December 16, 2016.

Cast
Pyay Ti Oo as Htun Thit Oo
Kyaw Ye Aung as Aww Gyi
Patricia as Su Hla Naing
Yan Aung as Mal Kin
Yaza Ne Win as Thatoe Yazar
Soe Myat Thuzar as Ko Myat
Yoon Shwe Yi as Win Win Shwe

References

2016 films
2010s Burmese-language films
Films shot in Myanmar
2016 comedy films
Burmese comedy films